Montenegro selected their first Junior Eurovision Song Contest 2014 entry through an internal selection. On 21 August 2014 it was revealed that Maša Vujadinović and Lejla Vulić would represent Montenegro in the contest with the song "Budi dijete na jedan dan".

Internal selection
On 18 July 2014, it was announced that Montenegro would be making their Junior Eurovision début at the 2014 contest. On 21 August 2014, it was revealed that 14 year-old Montenegrin singer Maša Vujadinović and 12 year-old Montenegrin-American singer Lejla Vulić would represent Montenegro at the contest with the song "Budi dijete na jedan dan".

At Junior Eurovision 
At the running order draw which took place on 9 November 2014, Montenegro were drawn to perform tenth on 15 November 2014, following  and preceding . At the close of the voting, Montenegro placed 14th in a field of 16 songs, scoring 24 points.

Voting

Detailed voting results
The following members comprised the Montenegrin jury:
 Boban Novović
 Zoja Đurović
 Nina Žižić
 Srđan Bulatović
 Snežana Ćosović

Notes

References

Junior Eurovision Song Contest
Montenegro
Junior